CoffeeCup HTML Editor is an HTML editor. Originally created by Nicholas Longo and Kevin Jurica, it was first released to the public in August 1996. Until version 12.5 released in 2012, it was capable of WYSIWYG editing.

According to the authors the editor was the first to support JavaScript (version 3.5 Sep. 1996), split-screen editing (version 4.0, March 1997) and built-in FTP upload (version 5.2, February 1998).

It was voted Best Windows HTML Editor in the About.com Readers' Choice Awards two years in a row in 2011 and 2012.

References

External links
 

HTML editors
Web development software
1996 software
Windows-only shareware
Windows-only freeware